State of the Heart may refer to:
 State of the Heart (Maureen McGovern album)
 State of the Heart (Mary Chapin Carpenter album)
 "State of the Heart" (Mondo Rock song)
 "State of the Heart" (Philip Bailey song)
 "State of the Heart", a song by Prism from their album, Beat Street
 "State of the Heart", a song by Rick Springfield from his album, Tao
 "State of the Heart", a song by Noel Paul Stookey from Peter, Paul and Mary's album No Easy Walk To Freedom